The following is a list of sinkholes, blue holes, dolines, crown holes, cenotes, and pit caves. A sinkhole is a depression or hole in the ground caused by some form of collapse of the surface layer. Some are caused by karst processes—for example, the chemical dissolution of carbonate rocks or suffosion processes.  Sinkholes vary in size from  both in diameter and depth, and vary in form from soil-lined bowls to bedrock-edged chasms. Sinkholes may form gradually or suddenly, and are found worldwide.

21st century sinkholes

 2012 Ottawa sinkhole –  Regional Road 174 at the Jeanne D'Arc interchange on September 4, 2012. 
 2014 Ottawa sinkhole –   at the LRT tunnelling site at Waller Street, just south of Laurier Avenue on February 21, 2014.
 2014 National Corvette Museum sinkhole –  a sinkhole at 350 Corvette Drive, Bowling Green, Kentucky.
 2016 Ottawa sinkhole –  Rideau Street was closed to all traffic from June 8 to July 2, 2016 after it collapsed above excavations being made for the Rideau station of the Confederation Line.
 2016 Florence sinkhole –  a sinkhole, thought to have been caused by a bursting of a water pipe, opened up a  hole on the Arno river bank in Florence.
 2016 Ruijin sinkhole –   four cars fell into a sinkhole in Ruijin City.
The sinkhole continued to grow and stretched  in diameter on August 8.

Sinkholes of Australia

 Fossil Cave - a karst sinkhole in South Australia.
Kilsby sinkhole – in Mount Gambier, Southern Australia. 
 Koonalda Cave –   a cave located in Nullarbor Plain within South Australia.
 Little Blue Lake –   water-filled doline located near Mount Schank in South Australia.
 Piccaninnie Ponds Conservation Park
 The Grotto, Victoria –  a sinkhole geological formation and tourist attraction, found on the Great Ocean Road outside Port Campbell in Victoria, Australia.

Sinkholes of Brazil 
 Buraco das Araras (Goiás) – one of the largest quartzitic caves located in the State of Goiás, Brazil. Considered one of the largest sinkholes (dolinas) in the world
 Gruta do Centenário –  a cave located in the municipality of Mariana, Brazil, the largest and deepest quartzite cave in the world, and second in the country in terms of unevenness
 Lapa Terra Ronca – a dolomitic limestone cave inside the area of the Terra Ronca State Park in Brazil

Sinkholes of China 
 Dragon Hole - the deepest underwater sinkhole (blue hole), located in the Drummond Island reef of the Paracel Islands in the South China Sea. It is worth noting the Paracel Islands are disputed territory, claimed by the Peoples Republic of China, Republic of China (Taiwan), and Vietnam.
 Xiaozhai Tiankeng - the deepest sinkhole in the world (over 2,100 feet), located in Fenjie Count of Chongqing Municipality.

Sinkholes of Croatia 
 Blue Lake – a karst lake located near Imotski in southern Croatia
 Red Lake – a sinkhole containing a karst lake near the city of Imotski, Croatia

Sinkholes of the Czech Republic 
 Hranice Abyss – the deepest abyss in the Czech Republic, located near the town of Hranice (Přerov District)
 Macocha Gorge – a sinkhole in the Moravian Karst cave system of the Czech Republic
 Punkva Caves – a cave system of the Czech Republic located north of the city of Brno, near the town of Blansko

Sinkholes of Germany 
 Bullenkuhle – marshy lake in the extreme north of the district of Gifhorn in the north German state of Lower Saxony which has been formed into a sinkhole
 Danube Sinkhole – incipient underground stream capture in the Upper Danube Nature Park

Sinkholes of Italy 
 Gurio Lamanna - a flat, wide and shallow karst doline shaped like a coat of arms and very close to Pulicchio di Gravina and Tre Paduli.
 Lago di Doberdò –   a sinkhole in the Province of Gorizia, Friuli-Venezia Giulia, Italy
 Pozzo del Merro –  a flooded sinkhole in the countryside northeast of Rome, Italy
 Pulo di Altamura - a karst doline close to the city of Altamura containing some caves, where  Saint William of Montevergine (1085-1142) reportedly lived as a hermit for a certain period.
 Pulo di Molfetta
 Pulicchio di Gravina - an egg-shaped forested karst doline located in the territory of Gravina in Puglia and very close to Gurio Lamanna and Tre Paduli.

Sinkholes of Mexico
 Cave of Swallows –  an open air pit cave in the Municipality of Aquismón, San Luis Potosí
 Ik Kil –  a cenote outside Pisté in the Tinúm Municipality, Yucatán
 Sacred Cenote –  a  cenote at the pre-Columbian Maya archaeological site of Chichen Itza, in the northern Yucatán Peninsula
 Sima de las Cotorras –  a giant circular sinkhole in the karst plateau of the Mexican state of Chiapas
 Sistema Dos Ojos –  a flooded cave system located north of Tulum, on the Caribbean coast of the Yucatán Peninsula, in the state of Quintana Roo
 Sistema Sac Actun –  an underwater cave system situated along the Caribbean coast of the Yucatán Peninsula with passages to the north and west of the village of Tulum, in the state of Quintana Roo
 Zacatón –   a thermal water filled sinkhole belonging to the Zacatón system - a group of unusual karst features located in Aldama Municipality near the Sierra de Tamaulipas in the northeastern state of Tamaulipas

Sinkholes of Namibia
 Otjikoto Lake – a sinkhole lake that was created by a collapsing karst cave in Namibia

Sinkholes of South Africa
 Blyvooruitzicht sinkholes - ancient sinkhole in South Africa
 Boesmansgat – in South Africa; believed to be the sixth-deepest submerged freshwater cave (or sinkhole) in the world

Sinkholes of Turkey

 Akhayat sinkhole –  sinkhole in Mersin Province, Turkey
 Cennet and Cehennem –  two large sinkholes in the Taurus Mountains, in Mersin Province
 Egma Sinkhole –  sinkhole and the deepest cave in Turkey
 Kanlıdivane –  ancient city situated around a big sinkhole in Mersin Province

Sinkholes of the United States
 2014 National Corvette Museum sinkhole –  a sinkhole at 350 Corvette Drive, Bowling Green, Kentucky
 Bayou Corne sinkhole –  created from a collapsed underground salt dome cavern operated by Texas Brine Company and owned by Occidental Petroleum, discovered on August 3, 2012, and 350 nearby residents were advised to evacuate
 Big Basin Prairie Preserve St. Jacob's Well, Kansas, a water-filled sinkhole which lies in the Little Basin, and the Big Basin, a  crater-like depression
 Blue Hole (Castalia) –  a fresh water pond located in Castalia, Erie County, Ohio
 Blue Hole (New Mexico) –   circular, bell-shaped pool east of Santa Rosa, New Mexico
 Bottomless Lakes State Park Lazy Lagoon  lake, New Mexico, made up of three separate sinkholes
 Cedar Sink –  a vertical-walled large depression, Kentucky.
 Daisetta, Texas –   sits on a salt dome, in 1969, 1981, and again in 2008, sinkholes formed in the area
 Deep Lake (Florida) –  a natural sinkhole in Big Cypress National Preserve in Florida
 Deep Run Ponds Natural Area Preserve –  contains one of the largest remaining systems of Shenandoah Valley sinkhole ponds in the Commonwealth of Virginia
 Devil's Den Cave - a karst window over an underground river near Williston, Florida
 Devil's Millhopper Geological State Park - located in Gainesville, Florida
 Devil's Sinkhole State Natural Area –  a natural bat habitat near the city of Rocksprings in Edwards County in Texas
 Grassy Cove –   an enclosed valley in Cumberland County, Tennessee notable for its karst formations
 Lake Eola Park –   Lake Eola is  a sinkhole located in Downtown Orlando, Florida
 Lake Peigneur –  was originally a shallow freshwater body in Louisiana, until a man-made disaster on November 20, 1980 changed its structure, affecting the surrounding land and making it a brackish water lake
 Little Salt Spring –   a feature of the karst topography of Florida
 Makauwahi Cave - the largest limestone cave found in Kauai, Hawaii
 Marvel Cave –  a National Natural Landmark located just west of Branson, Missouri, on top of Roark Mountain in Stone County
 Montezuma Well –  a natural limestone sinkhole near the town of Rimrock, Arizona
 Mount Joy Pond Natural Area Preserve – a large sinkhole pond located in Augusta County, Virginia
 NR-1 Sinkhole - an underwater sinkhole first located by the NR-1 submarine; located southwest of Key West, Florida
 Peter Sinks –  a natural sinkhole in northern Utah, one of the coldest places in the contiguous United States
 Pipe Creek Sinkhole –   near Swayzee in Grant County, Indiana, important paleontological site
 The Inkpot –  27 meter sinkhole located at the Salt Creek Wilderness Area north of Roswell, New Mexico
 Trout Pond –  a sinkhole that filled with water near Wardensville in Hardy County, West Virginia

Sinkholes of Venezuela
 Sima Humboldt
 Sima Martel
 Haitón del Guarataro

Other locations

 Biržai Regional Park – a park in  northern Lithuania established in 1992 to preserve a distinctive karst landscape
 Dead Sea sinkholes
 Dean's Blue Hole – the world's second deepest known salt water blue hole with an entrance below the sea level; in the Bahamas
 Dersios sinkhole – a sinkhole in Arcadia, Greece
 Devil's Hole, Bermuda – a large water-filled sinkhole, close to the southeastern corner of Harrington Sound, Bermuda
 Great Blue Hole – a giant submarine sinkhole off the coast of Belize
 Harwood Hole –  cave system located in the northwest of the South Island of New Zealand, New Zealand's deepest vertical shaft
 Hutchinson's Hole – a large sinkhole (located in Saint Ann in northern Jamaica),  used by a serial killer  to dispose of bodies
 Playa de Gulpiyuri – a flooded sinkhole with an inland beach located near Llanes, Spain
 Voulismeno aloni - Crete

See also
 Karst
List of deepest caves

References

Events in the geological history of Earth
sinkholes
Dinaric Alps
Dinaric karst formations